Richard Duncan (born December 25, 1973) is a retired Canadian long jumper. He was an eight-time NCAA All-American.

Career
Duncan finished fourth at the 1994 Commonwealth Games, in the high jump event.  In the long jump he competed at the 1996 Olympic Games, the 1997 World Championships, the 1999 World Championships the 2001 World Championships and the 2000 Olympic Games.  While attending the University of Texas, Duncan was the first athlete in history to earn All-American honors in the same NCAA Championship meet competing in the long, high, and triple jump events.

Honors
1993 CIAU Champion Triple Jump for York University
1996 NCAA Champion Long Jump for University of Texas
8 Time NCAA All-American

Personal Bests
His personal best marks are:

Long jump 8.23 metres, achieved in April 1997 in Austin.
Triple jump 16.83 meters, achieved in May 1996 in Lubbock.
High jump 2.26 meters, achieved in May 1994 in Austin, TX/Austin.

References

External links
 
 
 
 
 
 

1973 births
Living people
Athletes from Toronto
Athletes (track and field) at the 1994 Commonwealth Games
Athletes (track and field) at the 1998 Commonwealth Games
Athletes (track and field) at the 1999 Pan American Games
Athletes (track and field) at the 1996 Summer Olympics
Athletes (track and field) at the 2000 Summer Olympics
Canadian male long jumpers
Canadian male high jumpers
Olympic track and field athletes of Canada
Commonwealth Games competitors for Canada
Pan American Games track and field athletes for Canada
World Athletics Championships athletes for Canada
Texas Longhorns men's track and field athletes
York Lions players
20th-century Canadian people
21st-century Canadian people